Frizel-Welling House, also known as the Charles Welling House and Joseph Frizel House, is a historic home located at Jackson, Cape Girardeau County, Missouri.  It was built in 1838, and is a -story, three bay, Greek Revival style frame dwelling with a -story wing constructed in 1818.  It has a front gable roof with pedimented front gable.

It was listed on the National Register of Historic Places in 1999.

References

Houses on the National Register of Historic Places in Missouri
Greek Revival houses in Missouri
Houses completed in 1838
Houses in Cape Girardeau County, Missouri
National Register of Historic Places in Cape Girardeau County, Missouri